Arthur Woodruff (12 April 1913 – 5 January 1983) was an English professional footballer who played as a centre-half.

References

External links
 

1913 births
1983 deaths
English footballers
Footballers from Barnsley
Association football central defenders
Burnley F.C. players
Bradford City A.F.C. players
Northwich Victoria F.C. managers
Workington A.F.C. players
English Football League players
English Football League representative players
Worcester City F.C. players
English football managers
FA Cup Final players